

Paleontologists
 Birth of German Paleontologist Christian Hermann Erich von Meyer.

References

1800s in paleontology
Paleontology